= Sun Wu =

Sun Wu may refer to:

- Sun Wu (孫武), the birth name of Sun Tzu, a Chinese military strategist of the sixth century BC and the author of The Art of War
- Sun Wu (孫吳), an alternative name for Eastern Wu, a state in southeastern China during the Three Kingdoms period
